Octagon is an unincorporated community in Wabash Township, Tippecanoe County, in the U.S. state of Indiana.

The community is part of the Lafayette, Indiana Metropolitan Statistical Area.

History

A post office was established at Octagon in 1866, and remained in operation until it was discontinued in 1900.

Geography

References

Unincorporated communities in Tippecanoe County, Indiana
Unincorporated communities in Indiana
Lafayette metropolitan area, Indiana